Camp is an unincorporated community in Pike County, in the U.S. state of Ohio.

History
A post office called Camp was established in 1890, and remained in operation until 1950. The community derives its name from nearby Camp Creek.

References

Unincorporated communities in Pike County, Ohio
Unincorporated communities in Ohio